Vriesea strobeliae is a species of plant in the family Bromeliaceae. It is endemic to Ecuador.  Its natural habitat is subtropical or tropical dry forests.

References

Flora of Ecuador
strobeliae
Endangered plants
Taxonomy articles created by Polbot